Drugera is a genus of moths of the family Notodontidae.

Selected species
Drugera morona (Druce, 1898)
Drugera santiago Thiaucourt & Miller, 2011

References

Notodontidae